Lane Township may refer to the following townships in the United States:

 Lane Township, Warrick County, Indiana
 Lane Township, Greenwood County, Kansas

See also 
 Cherry Lane Township, Alleghany County, North Carolina